Every Singaporean Son is a Singaporean documentary released in 2010. It serves as an education tool for all pre-enlistees during their Basic Military Training in Singapore. Most of the episodes were filmed at Pulau Tekong. 18 episodes were released. The first episode airs on 7 July 2010 on YouTube, subsequent episodes were released on every Tuesday, each clip lasted for 6 to 8 minutes.

The 18-part series was filmed between 5 February 2010 to 8 April 2010.

National Geographic Channel ordered the series and it will be aired in six episodes (30 minutes per episode) from 8 March 2011.

In August 2011, the season branched out to another 6-part series named: Every Singaporean Son – Epilogue.

The documentary was nominated for "Best Cross-Platform Content" at the 16th Asian Television Awards 2011, but the series lost to the Indian series The CJ Show.

On 16 August 2012, the series branched out to its second season of Every Singaporean Son, premiering every Thursday of the week, it will be named: Every Singaporean Son II - The Making of an Officer. The series will concentrate on batch of cadets training to be officers in OCS Officer Cadet School, it will last for 20 to 25 episodes.

The show aired on Mediacorp Channel 5 on Mondays at 7pm from 31 March 2014 to 5 May 2014, each episode lasted for 30 minutes (including commercial breaks), the 18 short episode series was compacted into 7 episodes.

Plot
In nine weeks, 15 young men from different backgrounds came together for the rite of passage that every Singaporean son must experience, which is to survive the 9 weeks of Basic Military Training. The documentary is split into 18 episodes allowing all pre-enlistees and parents understand the life in BMT.

Cast

Recruits
All the recruits were from the BMTC School 2 Orion Company Platoon 1 Section 4.

 REC Muhd Nabil
 REC Loh De Wei
 REC Muhd Syabil
 REC Dudley Lin
 REC Chandra Thiaghu
 REC Kenneth Ng
 REC Justin Mark
 REC Goh Qingwei
 REC Danial Hakim
 REC Douglas Wong
 REC Lemuel Teo
 REC Huang Guoquan
 REC Daryl Lim
 REC Shawn Lee
 REC Dom Ang (Shaoquan)

Superiors
 CPT Roger Chen - Officer Commanding
 2LT Shamsul - Platoon Commander
 3SG Glen Liang - Section Commander
 2SG Hanafee - Platoon Sergeant

Episodes
{| class="wikitable plainrowheaders"
|- style="color:#FFF"
! style="background:#20EF10" | Episode No.
! style="background:#20EF10" | Episode Title
! style="background:#20EF10" | Original air date

|}

References

External links
Official website
National Geographic Channel

Singaporean television series
2010 Singaporean television seasons